The Medieval Seat Fortress of Suceava ( or Cetatea Sucevei;  or Festung Suceava) is a fortified castle in the middle-sized town of Suceava, the county seat town of Suceava County, situated in the historical region of Bukovina, northeastern Romania. 

The castle served as the royal seat fortress for the Princes of Moldavia during the Late Middle Ages. Nowadays, it is a tourist attraction of Suceava. It has been further renovated through a REGIO programme based on European Union funds. The Medieval Seat Fortress of Suceava is also a historic monument officially listed by the Ministry of Culture of Romania.

History 

The castle was built during the late 14th century during the reign of Petru Mușat. It was subsequently more fortified in the time of Alexander I and Stephen III. During the Late Middle Ages, it was part of a system of medieval strongholds built by the Moldavian monarchs in order to withstand the expansionist threat of the Ottoman Empire. For the time during which the town of Suceava served as the capital of Moldavia, namely between 1388 and 1565, the castle also served as princely residence.

Alexandru Lăpușneanu subsequently moved the capital to Iași in 1565 and so the castle lost its status and consequently fell into a long period of decay. Although it has never been conquered by its invaders, regardless from where they stemmed, the castle was destroyed Dumitrașcu Cantacuzino. Following its destruction, it was abandoned for more than two centuries.

After the northern highlands of the former medieval Principality of Moldavia were annexed by the Habsburg monarchy following the Treaty of Küçük Kaynarca during the late 18th century and became henceforth known as Bukovina, the castle was eventually repaired by Austrian architect Karl Adolf Romstorfer, who raised its defensive walls from ruin and also worked on its keep during the late 19th century and early 20th century.

During the late 20th century, more specifically throughout the 1960s (i.e. in communism), there have also been a series of restoration and consolidation works carried out on the surface of the castle.

Heraldic on display in the castle 

The heraldic symbols on display in the castle pertain to the Moldavian nobility of the Late Middle Ages, more specifically to the Moldavian rulers. The most common heraldry is the coat of arms of Stephen III the Great (who was also given the title Athleta Christi by Pope Sixtus IV for defending Europe against the Ottoman Turks at the Battle of Vaslui in 1475).

Digital facilities 

The castle disposes of entertaining digital facilities that enable a real-time simulation of the outfits of its visitors into medieval costumes, ascribing them a medieval title in the process (e.g. soldier or merchant).

Visiting areas 

The castle can be visited both in the inner courtyard, in the main keep, in the cellars, in the throne room, and on the surrounding defensive walls.

Geography 

The Medieval Seat Fortress of Suceava is located on the eastern ridge of the town of Suceava, overlooking the town. It was constructed on a plateau that rises 70 metres above the river meadow of Suceava. It is surrounded by trees on all sides and by a nearby forest both to the west and east.

Bucovina Rock Castle 

Aside from its tourist attraction and historical statuses, the Medieval Seat Fortress of Suceava had also been the site of a yearly rock music festival entitled Bucovina Rock Castle in the recent past, a festival where both national and international rock artists and bands performed. A major international rock artist who had performed at the Bucovina Rock Castle was Dutch jazz fusion and progressive rock guitarist Jan Akkerman of Focus in 2015.

Ștefan cel Mare Medieval Art Festival 

On a yearly basis, the Ștefan cel Mare medieval art festival is held in the fortress. The festival consists of jousts, pyrotechnic and laser shows, medieval singing and dancing, fight scenes, drama plays for children, archery, stuns with horses, interactive activities, or various contests.

Trivia 

The former football club FC Cetatea Suceava was named in honour of the castle. The club was active from 2004 until 2010 and played on the local Areni stadium.

Gallery

References 

Castles in Romania
Historic sites in Romania
History of Romania
History of Suceava County
Historic monuments in Suceava County
Historic monuments in Romania
Buildings and structures in Suceava
Buildings and structures in Suceava County
Tourist attractions in Suceava County
Architecture in Romania
Landmarks in Romania
Tourist attractions in Romania
Monuments and memorials in Romania